Ministry of Finance is one of the governmental bodies of Kuwait and part of the cabinet. It is concerned with the executive general administration of public financial affairs in the State of Kuwait. The current minister is Abdulwahab Al-Rushaid.

History and profile
On 2 July 1938, the Financial Department was established in Kuwait. It dealt with the financial policies of the country until 1962 when the department was reorganized under the name of the ministry of finance and economy. In 1963 it was reshaped and named as ministry of finance and industry. Then the body was renamed as the ministry of finance and oil in 1965 and dealt with finance- and oil-related policies until April 1975 when the ministry of oil was established. At the same time the ministry was reorganized under the current name, the ministry of finance in 1975. The ministry extensively dealt with land purchases and comprehensive infrastructure projects.

In 1982 Public Investment Authority was established and attached to the ministry. The Kuwait Investment Authority was founded in 1985 and has been under the control of the ministry and has been headed by the finance minister. The ministry also regulates Kuwaiti stock market along with the Kuwait Stock Exchange, the Ministry of Commerce and Industry and the Central Bank of Kuwait.

The ministry which had been dominated by the Bani Jabir branch of the ruling family of Kuwait played a significant role during the invasion of Kuwait by Iraqi forces in 1990 in that it paid billions of dollars to allied countries in the form of aid or in contributions to the war effort. During this period the ministry was located at the London headquarters of the Kuwait Investment Office.

Ministry tasks 
The Ministry of Finance supervises the public treasury, state property (public and private), areas of international economic cooperation, monetary investment, and projects for compensatory deals. It also provides services for public hospitality, housing for state employees, integrated financial systems services, warehousing and public procurement systems and other developmental automated systems for all financial sectors in state agencies. In addition to preparing draft public budgets, preparing the final accounts of the state, setting rules for their implementation, following up on them, and supervising state revenues from taxes, financial stamps and expenditures, in a specialization issued by a decision of the Ministry of Finance. of 1986 and Decree-Law No. 31 of 1978 and No. 105 of 1980.

Ministers
Mashaan Khudhair Al-Mashaan, 1938 - 1939
Abdullah Al-Salim Al-Sabah, 1939 - 1940
Ahmad Al-Jaber Al-Sabah, 1940 - 1950
Jaber Al-Ahmad Al-Sabah, 1959 - 1965
Sabah Al-Ahmad Al-Sabah, acting, 1965 - 1967
Abdul Rahman Salem Al Ateeqi, 1967 - 1981
Abdul Latif Yousef Al-Hamad, 1981 - 1983
Ali Khalifa Al-Athbi Al-Sabah, 1983 - 1985
Jassem Al-Kharafi, 1985 - June 1990
Nasser Abdullah Al-Roudhan, 1991 - 1998
Ali Salem Al-Ali Al-Sabah, 1998 - 1999
Ahmad Al Abdullah Al Sabah, 1999 - 2001
Youssef Hamad Al-Ibrahim, 2001 - 2003
Muhammad Sabah Al-Salem Al-Sabah, acting, January 2003 - July 2003
Mahmoud Abdel-Khaleq Al-Nouri, July 2003 - 2005
Badr Mishary Al-Humaidhi, 2005 - 2007
Mustafa Jassem Al-Shamali, 2007 - May 2012
Nayef Falah Al-Hajraf, acting, May 2012 - August 2013
Salem Abdulaziz Al Sabah, August 2013 - January 2014 
Anas Khalid Al Saleh, January 2014 - December 2017
Nayef Falah Al-Hajraf, December 2017 - December 2019
Mariam Al-Aqeel, December 2019 - February 2020
Barak Ali Barak Al-Sheetan, February 2020 - December 2020 
Khalifa Musaed Hamada, December 2020 - December 2021
Abdulwahab Al-Rushaid, December 2021 – present

References

1962 establishments in Kuwait
Economy of Kuwait
Kuwait
Finance
Finance